Carl Röchling (October 18, 1855 – May 6, 1920) was a German painter and illustrator known for his representation of historical military themes.

Life 

Röchling was born in Saarbrücken, part of the Prussian Rhine Province, son of Friedrich Röchling, a judiciary worker, and Angelika Stoll. He studied from 1875 to 1880 in the Karlsruhe Academy of Arts (Kunstschule) with Ludwig des Coudres and Ernst Hildebrand and later in the Prussian Academy of Arts.

While in Berlin, he was a pupil of the great master painter Anton von Werner, with whom he participated in the creation of various panoramic paintings such as Der Schlacht von Sedan ("The Battle of Sedan"). Later he became well known for his independent work of historical and military paintings in the turn of the 19th century. He died on May 6, 1920 in Berlin.

Works 

Among Röchling's most famous works of military themes are various depictions of battle scenes of Prussian army victories, especially those during the Franco-Prussian War.

Together with Georg Koch and Eugen Bracht a panorama of the Battle of Chattanooga is among his works. He also worked in partnership with Richard Knötel and Woldemar Friedrich in illustrating two popular children books (Der Alte Fritz in 50 Bildern für Jung und Alt in 1895 and Die Königin Luise in 50 Bildern für Jung und Alt in 1896).

References

External links

 Episode aus der Schlacht bei Gravelotte (Tod des Majors von Hadeln am 18.8.1870) in the Deutsches Historisches Museum, in German
 
 

1855 births
1920 deaths
People from Saarbrücken
People from the Rhine Province
19th-century German painters
German male painters
20th-century German painters
20th-century German male artists
19th-century war artists
19th-century German male artists